Philippe Besnard (18 November 1885 – 2 November 1971) was a French sculptor. He was buried at the Père Lachaise Cemetery.

References

1885 births
1971 deaths
Sculptors from Paris
French male sculptors
Burials at Père Lachaise Cemetery